The Brandeis Medal is awarded to individuals whose lives reflect United States Supreme Court Justice Louis Brandeis' commitment to the ideals of individual liberty, concern for the disadvantaged and public service.

The medal is awarded by the University of Louisville's Louis D. Brandeis Society, and is given in tribute to Brandeis, a former U.S. Supreme Court justice from Louisville and the namesake university's law school.

Past recipients
Past recipients  include U.S. Supreme Court justices Stephen Breyer, Ruth Bader Ginsburg, Harry Blackmun, Sandra Day O'Connor, and John Paul Stevens; former U.S. attorney general Janet Reno; U.S. Sen. Christopher Dodd; Kentucky Supreme Court Chief Justice John Palmore; civil rights lawyer Morris Dees; lawyer and professor Samuel Dash; and Howard Baker.

External links
https://web.archive.org/web/20060902150604/http://php.louisville.edu/advancement/ocm/news/release.php?relid=510 

Louis Brandeis
Human rights awards
Legal awards
University of Louisville